In Māori mythology, Kaitangata is either a mortal son of Māui, or a son of star-god Rehua.

Kaitangata, the son of Māui, is an industrious man who married the female supernatural being Whaitiri. Due to his name, Kaitangata means man-eater, Whaitiri believed him to be a cannibal as she was. However this proved to be incorrect and she eventually left him because he offended her. Before she returned to heaven as a cloud, she taught Kaitangata how to fish. With Whaitiri, he was the father of Hemā.

References

 B.G. Biggs, 'Maori Myths and Traditions' in A. H. McLintock (editor), Encyclopaedia of New Zealand, 3 Volumes. (Government Printer: Wellington), 1966, II:447-454.
 A.W. Reed, Treasury of Maori Folklore (A.H. & A.W. Reed:Wellington), 1963.

Māori mythology
Legendary Māori people